AppArmor Mobile is a division of Cutcom Software Inc. that builds custom mobile safety apps and emergency notification systems for university and college institutions in Canada, the United States, and Australia. The company was founded in 2002 and is based in Toronto, Ontario, Canada. A few of AppArmor's partner institutions include the University of Guelph, University of Nevada, Reno, Queen's University, Dalhousie University, Jacksonville University, and Wilfrid Laurier University.

AppArmor's safety apps include features such as push notifications, location tracking, and click-to-call capability.

References

Mobile security
Software companies of Canada